The Morrison Block, also known as M. O'Connor Grocery Wholesalers and Peoples Outfitting Building, is a historic commercial building located on South Meridian Street in Indianapolis, Indiana, United States.  It was built about 1870, and is a four-story, Italianate style timber frame and masonry building.  It features round arched windows and a projecting cornice.  The building has been restored.

It was listed on the National Register of Historic Places in 1979.

References

Commercial buildings on the National Register of Historic Places in Indiana
Italianate architecture in Indiana
Commercial buildings completed in 1870
Commercial buildings in Indianapolis
National Register of Historic Places in Indianapolis